Plasmodium cercopitheci is a parasite of the genus Plasmodium (subgenus Vinckeia) which infects the monkey Cercopithecis nictitans. The insect host of P. cercopitheci is unknown.

Taxonomy 
The parasite was first described by Thieler in 1930.

Hosts 
The only known host for this species is the monkey Cercopithecis nictitans.

References 

cercopitheci